Makarovka, may refer to:
Makarovka, Fatezhsky District, Kursk Oblast, a village in Kursk Oblast, Russia
Makarovka, Kurchatovsky District, Kursk Oblast, a village (selo) in Kursk Oblast
Makarovka, Vladimir Oblast
Makarovka, Volgograd Oblast
Makarovka, Altai Krai
Makarovka, Chekmagushevsky District, Republic of Bashkortostan
Makarovka, Republic of Mordovia, a village (selo) in the Republic of Mordovia, Russia